The La Galissonnière-class ironclads were a group of wooden-hulled, armored corvettes built for the French Navy during the 1870s, meant as a heavier armed and faster version of the s. While all three ships were begun before the Franco-Prussian War of 1870–71, the construction of the last two ships was delayed for years. The navy took advantage of the extended construction time of the latter ships to upgrade their armament.  bombarded Sfax in 1881 as part of the French occupation of Tunisia. She and her half-sister  participated in a number of battles during the Sino-French War of 1884–85. Their sister  had a much quieter career. All three ships were decommissioned in the 1890s.

Design and description
The La Galissonnière-class ironclads were designed as faster, more heavily armed versions of the s by Henri Dupuy de Lôme. They used the same central battery layout as their predecessors, although the battery was lengthened  to provide enough room to work the larger  guns. A two-propeller layout was adopted in an unsuccessful attempt to reduce the ship's draft. The two later ships were designed by Sabattier who reduced the number of screws from two to one to improve their sailing qualities, added an  bow chaser under the forecastle and increased the caliber of the secondary armament.

The crew of all three ships numbered between 352 and 382 officers and men.

Propulsion
La Galissonnière had two Wolf vertical compound steam engines, each driving a single  propeller. Her engines were powered by four oval boilers.

Victorieuse and Triomphante had a single vertical compound steam engine driving a single propeller and the same boilers as La Galissonnière. During trials their engines produced  and the ships reached .

Armament
All three ships mounted four of their six 240-millimeter Modèle 1870 guns in the central battery on the battery deck. The other two 240-millimeter guns were mounted in barbettes on the upper deck, sponsoned out over the sides of the ship. In La Galissonnière the sponsons were positioned abaft the funnel, but the two later ships had theirs just forward of the funnel. La Galissonnières secondary armament of four  guns was also mounted on the upper deck. They were replaced by six  guns in 1880.

The guns could fire both solid shot and explosive shells.

The ship received four  Hotchkiss 5-barrel revolving guns in 1878. They had a rate of fire of about 30 rounds per minute. La Galissonnière also received several towed Harvey torpedoes.

While Victorieuse and Triomphant were on the stocks, their armament was reinforced by an additional 194-millimeter chase gun and the secondary armament was increased to six  guns. They also received the Hotchkiss guns and Harvey torpedoes as per La Galissonnière before completion.

Armor
The unarmored portions of their sides were protected by thin iron plates.

Ships

Service
La Galissonnières initial commissions were in the Pacific and in the Caribbean, but she was assigned to the Levant Squadron when she bombarded the Tunisian port of Sfax in July 1881 as part of the French occupation of Tunisia. In early 1882 La Galissonnière was the flagship of the Levant Squadron under Rear Admiral Alfred Conrad. Both La Galissonnière and Triomphante were assigned to the Far East Squadron in 1884, under the command of Vice Admiral Amédée Courbet, and participated in several actions during the Sino-French War of 1884–85. Both ships fought in the Battle of Fuzhou, destroying a small Chinese fleet and coastal defenses defending the Min River. They supplied landing parties during the Battle of Tamsui in October 1884, but they were forced to retreat by Chinese troops, although suffering few casualties (11 killed and 4 wounded between the two ships). Nothing is known of any further participation by La Galissonnière in the war, but Triomphante helped to capture the Pescadore Islands in March 1885 during the Pescadores Campaign.

Victorieuse was placed into reserve after she finished her sea trials in 1876. She had two commissions as flagship of the Pacific and China Squadrons and was relieved as the flagship of the latter by La Galissonnière in April 1884. She became flagship of the Levant Squadron after she arrived in France, but was in bad shape and soon placed in reserve at Cherbourg. Victorieuse was on summer maneuvers off the Iberian coast in July 1893. The ship was initially condemned in May 1897, but this was reversed so she could convoy torpedo boats to Bizerte. That plan was later cancelled and Victorieuse was paid off in 1899, becoming guardship of the outer harbor at Brest until finally condemned the following year.

Footnotes

References
 

 
 
 
 

Ships built in France
 
Corvettes of France
Ship classes of the French Navy